This is a list of controversial elections arranged by continent and date.

By continent

Africa 

1991 Algerian legislative election (Algerian Civil War)
1996 Chadian presidential election
1997 Chadian parliamentary election
1997 Cameroonian presidential election
2003 Rwandan presidential election
2004 Cameroonian presidential election
2005 Ethiopian general election
2005 Egyptian presidential election
2006 Ugandan general election
2007 Nigerian general election
2007 Kenyan general election (see also 2007–2008 Kenyan crisis)
2008 Zimbabwean general election
2009 Algerian presidential election
2009 Equatorial Guinean presidential election
2010 Ethiopian general election
2010 Rwandan presidential election
2010 Ivorian presidential election
2011 Ugandan general election
2011 Cameroonian presidential election
2011 Ivorian parliamentary election
2013 Kenyan general election
2013 Zimbabwean general election
2013 Guinean legislative election
2013 Mauritanian parliamentary election
2014 Libyan Constitutional Assembly election (Inter-civil war violence in Libya)
2014 Algerian presidential election
2014 South African general election
2014 Malawian general election
2014 Mauritanian presidential election
2015 Zambian presidential election
2015 Sudanese general election
2015 Togolese presidential election
2015 Ethiopian general election
2015 Burundian legislative election (2015 Burundian unrest)
2015 Burundian presidential election (2015 Burundian unrest)
2015 Tanzanian general election
2016 Ugandan general election
2016 Republic of the Congo presidential election
2016 Djiboutian presidential election
2016 Chadian presidential election
2016 Equatorial Guinean presidential election
2016 Zambian general election
2016 Gabonese presidential election
2017 Rwandan presidential election
2018 Cameroonian presidential election
2018 Democratic Republic of the Congo general election
2019 Malawian general election
2019 Mauritian General Election
2021 Ugandan general election
2021 Chadian presidential election (led to Northern Chad offensive)
2022 Equatorial Guinean general election (self-contradicting numbers leading to an official turnout of 100.17%)

Asia 
March 1960 South Korean presidential election
1986 Philippine presidential election (see also People Power Revolution)
1987 Jammu and Kashmir Legislative Assembly election, Insurgency in the Indian state of Jammu and Kashmir has been linked to the allegations that the election was rigged in favour of the Jammu & Kashmir National Conference of Farooq Abdullah.
1990 Myanmar general election (see also 8888 Uprising, the military junta did not recognize the elections and Aung San Suu Kyi was placed under house arrest)
1994 Tajik presidential election
1995 Kazakh legislative election
1995 Armenian parliamentary election
1996 Armenian presidential election
1998 Armenian presidential election
1999 Kazakh presidential election
1999 Tajik presidential election
2000 Sri Lankan parliamentary election
2003 Armenian presidential election
2003 Azerbaijani presidential election
2004 Taiwan presidential election
2004 Philippine presidential election (see also Hello Garci scandal)
2004 Kazakh legislative election
2005 Kazakh presidential election
2006 Thai general election (2005–2006 Thai political crisis)
2006 Taiwanese municipal elections
2006 Tajik presidential election
2007 Philippine Senate election (see also Pimentel v. Zubiri electoral protest)
2007 Turkmen presidential election
2007 Kazakh legislative election
2007 Uzbek presidential election
2008 Armenian presidential election (2008 Armenian presidential election protests)
2008 Cambodian general election
2009 Afghan presidential election
2010 Myanmar general election
2011 Kazakh presidential election
2011 Thai general election
2012 Kazakh legislative election
2012 Turkmen presidential election
2012 Myanmar by-elections
2012 Armenian parliamentary election
2013 Armenian presidential election (2013 Armenian protests)
2013 Malaysian general election
2013 Pakistani general election
2013 Cambodian general election (2013–2014 Cambodian protests)
2013 Tajik presidential election
2014 Bangladeshi general election
2014 Thai general election (2013–2014 Thai political crisis)
2014 Turkish local elections (2013–2014 protests in Turkey)
2014 Afghan presidential election
2014 Turkish presidential election
2015 Uzbek presidential election
2015 Kazakh presidential election
2015 Azerbaijani parliamentary election
2015 Turkish general election
2015 Myanmar general election
2015 Armenian constitutional referendum
2016 Kazakh legislative election
2016 Hong Kong legislative election (See 2016 Hong Kong LegCo candidates' disqualification controversy)
2017 Turkmen presidential election
2017 Jakarta gubernatorial election
2017 Armenian parliamentary election
2017 Singaporean presidential election 
2018 Hong Kong by-election (some candidates were disqualified due to their stance on Hong Kong independence)
2018 Cambodian general election
2019 Indonesian general election
2019 Thai general election
2019 Kazakh presidential election (2018–2020 Kazakh protests)
2020 Gilgit-Baltistan Assembly election : Bilawal Bhutto Zardari, the leader of opposition Pakistan Peoples Party, alleged that the election had been rigged in favour of ruling Pakistan Tehreek-e-Insaf. 
2020 Myanmar general election (led to 2021 Myanmar coup d'état)
2021 Kazakh legislative election
2021 Hong Kong legislative election (See Postponement of the 2020 Hong Kong legislative election and 2020 Hong Kong LegCo candidates' disqualification controversy)
2021 Syrian presidential election (incumbent president since 2000, Bashar al-Assad, won by over 95% votes, election widely condemned by international community as fraudulent even before the voting took place)

Central America 

2013 Honduran general election
2017 Honduran general election
2021 Nicaraguan general election

Europe 

1946 Bulgarian republic referendum
1946 Romanian general election
1947 Hungarian parliamentary election
1958 Portuguese presidential election
1961 Greek legislative election
1992 Serbian general election
1993 Serbian parliamentary election
1996 Russian presidential election
1997 Serbian general election
1997 Serbian presidential election
2000 Yugoslavian general election
2003 Georgian parliamentary election
2004 Romanian general election
2004 Ukrainian presidential election
2005 United Kingdom general election
2006 Belarusian presidential election
2006 Italian general election

2007 Russian legislative election
2011 Russian legislative election
2012 Russian presidential election
2012 Ukrainian parliamentary election
2013 Bulgarian parliamentary election
2014 Hungarian parliamentary election
2014 Ukrainian presidential election
2014 Romanian presidential election
2015 Belarusian presidential election
2016 Serbian parliamentary election
2016 Austrian presidential election
2016 Romanian legislative election
2018 Hungarian parliamentary election
2019 European Parliament election in Bulgaria
2020 Belarusian presidential election

Middle East 

2006 Palestinian legislative election
2009 Iranian presidential election
2010 Iraqi parliamentary election
2012 Syrian parliamentary election
2013 Jordanian general election
2014 Iraqi parliamentary election
2014 Syrian presidential election
2014 Bahraini general election
2021 Iranian presidential election

North America 
This is a list of notable elections involving accusations of direct voter fraud or in which the results were procedurally contested, extensively protested, or recognized as fraudulent by a reliable international organization.

Canada
1957 Canadian federal election - The election of the Liberal candidate in Yukon was contested by the losing Tory candidate. After a trial before the Yukon Territorial Court, that court voided the election, holding that enough ineligible people had been permitted to vote to affect the outcome, though the court noted that it was not the fault of the Liberal candidate that these irregularities had occurred. The Tory, Erik Nielsen, won the by-election on December 16, 1957., 
2011 Canadian federal election - During the Robocall scandal, Elections Canada and the Royal Canadian Mounted Police investigated widespread reports of robocalls from Conservative Party campaign offices misleading voters from casting ballots by claiming that their polling stations had been changed, an act of electoral fraud and voter suppression under the Canada Elections Act. Although the investigation was initially centered around the riding of Guelph, Ontario, further instances were reported around the country, leading to widespread protests. Although the Commissioner of Canada Elections ultimately refused to press charges against the Conservative Party, a junior staffer named Michael Sona was ultimately convicted of voter fraud.

Mexico
1988 Mexican general election - The election was the first in which Mexico introduced a parallel vote tabulation system in which electoral districts report results by telephone to the Secretariat of the Interior. Although early results showed the National Democratic Front (FDN) candidate Cuauhtémoc Cárdenas in the lead, Secretary of the Interior Manuel Bartlett claimed that the new voting system had broken down, and the Institutional Revolutionary Party (PRI) candidate Carlos Salinas de Gortari ultimately was declared the winner. In 1991, President Miguel de la Madrid admitted in his autobiography that the breakdown had been faked and that there were no complete results when Salinas de Gortari was declared the winner. The result was the lowest performance for any winning President since the institution of direct elections for the presidency under the 1917 Constitution, and the PRI's worst electoral performance since dominating Mexican politics after 1929.
2006 Mexican general election - The election was plagued by irregularities, and President Vicente Fox was accused of using government resources to favor the PAN candidate Felipe Calderón over the initially heavily favored PRD candidate Andrés Manuel López Obrador. The official election results gave Calderón a very narrow victory with 35.89% of the votes, with López Obrador in second place with 35,31% of the votes. López Obrador refused to recognize the results and claimed victory for himself; a political crisis ensued, and there were nationwide protests calling for a complete recount of the votes, which was rejected by the Federal Electoral Tribunal. In spite of the protests, Calderón took office as president on 1 December; only ten days later he declared war on the drug cartels, thus beginning the Mexican Drug War, a move widely perceived to have been an extraordinary step to gain popular legitimacy after the chaotic electoral process.
2012 Mexican general election - After the PRI candidate Enrique Peña Nieto was declared the winner, the Yo Soy 132 movement emerged protesting the results due to reports that the PRI had participated in campaign finance violations, electoral fraud, and vote buying by providing poor voters with Soriana store credit cards. Although Peña Nieto was eventually redeclared the winner after a recount endorsed by the United States, unrest continued through Peña Nieto's inauguration.

United States
1792 New York gubernatorial election – The Federalist Party candidate John Jay received more votes than the Democratic-Republican Party candidate George Clinton, but on technicalities, the votes of Otsego, Tioga and Clinton counties were rejected, giving George Clinton a slight majority in the official result.
1824 United States presidential election - John Quincy Adams became President after winning a contingent election in the House of Representatives due to the absence of an absolute majority in the Electoral College, despite the fact that Andrew Jackson (who would win the 1828 presidential election) won a plurality of the popular and electoral vote.
Bleeding Kansas election, March 30, 1855 – An election to decide whether Kansas should be a free state or a slave state involved massive immigration to sway the vote and resulted in post-election violence, including a severe beating of a US Senator by a Congressman. The events it encompasses directly presaged the American Civil War. (See Kansas–Nebraska Act)
1876 United States presidential election – One of the most disputed and controversial presidential elections in American history between the Democratic Party's candidate Samuel J. Tilden and the Republican Party's candidate Rutherford B. Hayes was resolved by the Compromise of 1877, which allowed Hayes to become president in exchange for the end of Reconstruction and the withdrawal of all federal troops stationed in the South after the American Civil War. Although it is generally agreed that Tilden won a majority of the popular vote, the results of the electoral vote continue to be disputed.
1888 United States presidential election - The incumbent Democrat President Grover Cleveland won the popular vote, but Benjamin Harrison won the electoral vote. Cleveland would be re-elected in 1892.
1891 New York State Senate election in Dutchess County
1948 United States Senate election in Texas - Lyndon B. Johnson won the Democratic primary over Coke R. Stevenson by only 87 votes. However, Johnson was accused of voter fraud in Duval County, as it had initially appeared Stevenson had won before 200 votes were allegedly found for Johnson.
1960 United States presidential election - Some accounts claimed that mobster Sam Giancana and his Chicago crime syndicate played a role in Kennedy's victory in Illinois.
2000 United States presidential election - After a close election in which the winner was unclear, the Republican candidate George W. Bush won Florida by such a slim margin that a recount of the votes was triggered under Florida state law, beginning a series of legal battles between Bush and the Democratic candidate Al Gore and considerable public controversy. After the completion of a machine recount, the Florida Supreme Court ordered a manual recount due to continued concerns over the validity of the election. The case was appealed to the Supreme Court, which halted the recount in the Bush v. Gore and Bush v. Palm Beach County Canvassing Board decisions, which Bush to win Florida by a 0.009 percent margin and the electoral vote.
2002 Alabama gubernatorial election - Although the incumbent Democratic Governor Don Siegelman was initially declared the winner by a close majority, the Republican candidate Bob Riley ultimately won after a recount in Baldwin County without the presence of Democratic observers.
2002 New Hampshire Senate election phone jamming scandal - During the 2002 United States Senate election in New Hampshire, the New Hampshire Republican State Committee hired a telemarketing firm to jam the phone bank used by the Democratic Party in a "get out the vote" operation. The Republican candidate John E. Sununu won a narrow victory over the Democratic candidate Jeanne Shaheen, while James Tobin was later charged for lying to the FBI.
2004 United States presidential election : The certification of Republican electors in Ohio were legally challenged. Representative John Conyers investigated voter suppression, culminating in his report What went wrong in Ohio. Several independent election-denying researchers including Bob Fitrakis, Mark Crispin Miller, Steven F. Freeman, Richard Hayes Phillips and Richard Charnin published books claiming that Bush won the election due to Electoral fraud and Voter suppression.
2004 Washington gubernatorial election - After a close election in which the Republican candidate Dino Rossi was declared the winner in the initial election and the machine count, the Democratic candidate Christine Gregoire was declared the winner after a manual recount. Rossi made an unsuccessful legal challenge to the results, and did not officially concede the election for seven months.
2008 United States Senate election in Minnesota -  Republican incumbent Norm Coleman initially led against the Democratic-Farmer-Labor Party candidate Al Franken, but the close margin triggered a mandatory recount under Minnesota state law; Franken was ultimately declared the winner by the Minnesota State Canvassing Board.
2016 United States presidential election - The election was widely characterized as divisive and negative and was plagued by scandals such as the Republican candidate Donald Trump's alleged sexual misconduct and the Democratic candidate Hillary Rodham Clinton's alleged improper use of an email server. No Russian citizen accused of interfering in the election in the form of online influencing from a St. Petersburg-based troll farm has been formally charged, and as result no Court will have the opportunity to review evidence to support or dispute accusations of Russian interference that adhere to the standards of the United States Judicial System for proving guilt. Trump ultimately won an upset victory in the Electoral College despite Clinton's victory in the popular vote, and characterized the Russian interference as a "hoax" and "fake news" despite the conclusions of the U.S. intelligence community to the contrary. In 2016, the FBI initiated the Crossfire Hurricane investigation over the Russian meddling in the election and links between Trump associates and Russian officials, and President Trump dismissed FBI Director James Comey due to his continuation of the investigation. Due to allegations of collusion with the Russian government, Deputy Attorney General Rod Rosenstein appointed Robert Mueller as Special Counsel to lead an investigation. Although the investigation resulted in 34 indictments and eight criminal convictions, it was refraining from making a judgment about whether Trump could be criminally charged for obstruction of justice due to his conduct during the investigation. In 2020 US Attorney General William Barr initiated a criminal investigation of the Rosenstein/Mueller collusion investigation in response to its questionable basis and procedures.
2017 United States Senate special election in Alabama - During the election to fill U.S. Attorney General Jeff Sessions's vacated Senate seat in Alabama, the Republican Party candidate Roy Moore refused to concede the election after being defeated by the Democratic Party candidate Doug Jones despite pressure from his ally President Donald Trump's administration to do so, claiming that he had been the victim of a voter fraud conspiracy. Moore was additionally plagued by sexual misconduct allegations, including allegations of child molestation.
2018 Georgia gubernatorial election - Brian Kemp retained his post as Georgia Secretary of State after his nomination by the Republican Party for Governor of Georgia, leading to conflict of interest allegations. Due to irregularities in voter registration, the Republican state government was accused of voter suppression, while U.S. District Court Judge Leigh Martin May ruled that Gwinnett County violated civil rights law by rejecting absentee ballots. After the election was re-certified, the Democratic Party candidate Stacey Abrams ended her campaign, but refused to concede the election.
2020 Iowa Democratic caucuses - The Iowa Democratic Party was initially unable to collect and announce results due to the failure of a mobile application designed to collect the votes. Although the results were eventually released with Pete Buttigieg leading, they have been subject to scrutiny and the Democratic National Committee Chairman Tom Perez has advocated a recanvassing of the votes.
2020 Wisconsin Democratic primary - During the COVID-19 pandemic, Tony Evers, Wisconsin Governor moved to delay the primary election because voters were expected to shelter in place to minimize the spread of the virus. The Wisconsin Supreme Court stepped in and ruled that this was not allowed, while the U.S. Supreme Court also ruled 5-4 that the election would take place as scheduled, disregarding the fact that only five of the 180 polling places would be open due to a lack of poll workers due to the coronavirus pandemic. President Donald Trump stated, "The things they had in there [the Coronavirus Aid, Relief, and Economic Security Act] were crazy. They had things — levels of voting that, if you ever agreed to it, you'd never have a Republican elected in this country again." It is fair to note that a seat for the Wisconsin State Supreme Court was on the ballot, which a Democrat won.
2020 United States presidential election — The election was heavily reliant on mail-in ballots due to the COVID-19 pandemic. The Republican Donald Trump repeatedly alleged that mail-in ballots would allow the Democratic Party to commit electoral fraud. In response, Trump's critics accused him of blocking funding to the U.S. Postal Service to sabotage the election, although Postmaster General Louis DeJoy later agreed to delay certain changes until after the election. Trump also suggested that he would not accept the results if he lost and even refused to commit to a peaceful transition, after footage surfaced of an election centers blocking the windows, although later Lawrence Garcia, a city of Detroit's corporation counsel, said those measures were taken to ensure that the counting process wasn't shown to the public. Although the situation didn't end conclusively, such actions only fueled the right wing distrust of the electoral process. Soon, a unanimous vote of the U.S. Senate, and the U.S. Armed Forces announced their commitment to a peaceful transition. Various allegations of fraud relating to election processes in Wisconsin, Michigan, Pennsylvania and Arizona begun after the votes stopped being counted at midnight. Trump ultimately lost the election to Joe Biden, but refused to concede, continued to repeat allegations of voter fraud, and obstructed the presidential transition. There were also hundreds of affidavits across the country alleging that there was voter fraud and voter irregularities. On January 6, 2021, a mob breached the police lines and invaded the U.S. Capitol, delaying the counting of the electoral votes by several hours, and resulting in the shooting death of a protestor. Trump was subsequently impeached by the House due to his being accused of inciting the insurrection; he was later acquitted of these charges by the United States Senate.

Oceania 

2014 Fijian general election
April 2021 Samoan general election

South America 

1931 Argentine general election
1937 Argentine presidential election
1971 Uruguayan general election
2000 Peruvian general election
Haitian general election, 2010–2011
2013 Venezuelan presidential election
2014 Brazilian general election
2017 Venezuelan Constituent Assembly election (Part of Crisis in Venezuela)
2018 Venezuelan presidential election (Part of Crisis in Venezuela, led directly to Venezuelan presidential crisis)
2019 President of the Federal Senate of Brazil election
2019 Bolivian general election (similar to the situation 2017 in Honduras, results allegedly altered after trend indicated a run-off between incumbent Evo Morales and candidate Carlos Mesa)
2020 Venezuelan parliamentary election (Part of Crisis in Venezuela)
2021 Peruvian general election
2022 Brazilian general election

Examples of electoral fraud
Reconstruction, an effort to secure the voting rights of former slaves after the American Civil War, ultimately failed in the former Confederate States because of reactionary interests by using violence and intimidation against freedmen and political tactics (including poll taxes and so-called literacy tests) to disenfranchise African-Americans and to ensure the continuing hegemony of elite agrarian interests at the expense of all other interests in the South until the Voting Rights Act of 1965.
 Politically enabled by the Reichstag Fire Decree on March 23, 1933, Adolf Hitler arrested or ordered the murder of all members from the Communist Party of Germany who had been unable to flee or hide and some from the Social Democratic Party of Germany before he intimidated most of the other members into supporting him. That helped his NSDAP to get the required two-thirds majority to pass the Enabling Act, which gave him dictatorial powers.
In Romania, the heavily rigged election of 1946 formalized the communist takeover and the destruction of multiparty democracy.
Ferdinand Marcos, who had been fairly elected as President of the Philippines in 1965, remained in power and became increasingly dictatorial and kleptocratic, as he succeeded in marginalizing dissent and opposition through allegedly-rigged elections.
Many dictatorships and former Warsaw Pact nations hold show elections in which results predictably show that nearly 100% of all eligible voters vote and that nearly 100% of those eligible voters vote for the prescribed or often only list of candidates for office or for referendums that favour the party in power, irrespective of economic conditions and the cruelties of the government.
Slobodan Milošević was accused of rigging elections in 1996 and 2000. After massive popular protests, he resigned in October 2000.
It was widely held in the Ukrainian media that the Ukrainian election of 2004 was also marked by ballot rigging and voter intimidation on all sides.
Both tabloid press accusations and several anecdotal public claims of postal vote fraud in both Birmingham and Hackney dogged many aspects of the general elections of 2001 and of 2005. They were reviewed in the Court of Appeal. There were also claims made over postal vote fraud and intimidation at the 2004 European and local government elections in Birmingham 
Both the 2006 election in Uganda and the 2007 election in Kenya were marred by opposition claims of the ruling parties cheating their way to stay in power by massive electoral fraud.

See also
ACCURATE
Ballot stuffing
Blue shift (politics)
Electoral integrity
Voter fraud
Voting machine

References

Controversial
Election law
Electoral restrictions
Fraud
Electoral fraud